The Canadian Journal of Bioethics (French: Revue canadienne de bioéthique) is a peer-reviewed open-access academic journal hosted by the Bioethics Program at the School of Public Health, Université de Montréal. It covers all aspects of bioethics in French or English. The founding and current editor-in-chief is Bryn Williams-Jones (Université de Montréal). The journal was established in 2012 as BioéthiqueOnline, obtaining its current title in 2018.

Publishing and financing
The journal publishes under a Creative Commons License, in collaboration with Université de Montréal Libraries and the non-profit consortium Érudit, and is supported by grants from the Canadian Social Sciences and Humanities Research Council (SSHRC), Érudit and the Canadian Research Knowledge Network (CRKN).

Abstracting and indexing
The journal is abstracted and indexed in:

See also
List of bioethics journals
List of open-access journals

References

External links

Publications established in 2012
Online-only journals
Bioethics journals
Multilingual journals
Continuous journals
Academic journals published in Canada